Nancy was a weekly podcast produced by WNYC Studios. It was hosted by Kathy Tu and Tobin Low. The first episode debuted on April 9, 2017. The show's last episode was aired on June 29, 2020. The series features a range of topics exploring the LGBTQ experience.

List of episodes

List of Nancy episodes

See also 
 List of LGBT podcasts

References

External links 

 

WNYC Studios programs
LGBT-related podcasts
2017 podcast debuts
2020 podcast endings
Interview podcasts
Audio podcasts
Feminist podcasts